Sir David Haller (born 27 January 1945) is a British former swimmer. He competed in the men's 100 metre freestyle at the 1964 Summer Olympics.

References

1945 births
Living people
British male swimmers
Olympic swimmers of Great Britain
Swimmers at the 1964 Summer Olympics
Place of birth missing (living people)
British male freestyle swimmers